Wafula Wanyonyi Chebukati is the chairman of the IEBC, Kenya's elections regulatory agency. He was appointed to the position on a six-year tenure in January 2017 by the President of Kenya Uhuru Kenyatta following his nomination in December 2016. He succeeded Ahmed Issack Hassan.

Career
Chebukati is a Kenyan lawyer with an interest in corporate governance. In 2006 he founded a Nairobi-based law firm Cootow & Associates Advocates. 

He was a politician belonging to the Orange Democratic Movement, and once contested the Saboti Constituency parliamentary seat in the year 2007. 

In Jan 2017 he joined IEBC as Chair  and has so far overseen three elections: 2017 Kenyan general election, October 2017 Kenyan presidential election  and the 2022 Kenyan general election.

Early life and education
He holds a Bachelor of Law degree from the University of Nairobi, and Master of Business Administration from the JKUAT. 
He is a member of LSK, Institute of Certified Secretaries, and ICJ.

References

1961 births
Living people
Alumni of Lenana School
University of Nairobi alumni
Jomo Kenyatta University of Agriculture and Technology alumni
Kenya School of Law alumni
21st-century Kenyan politicians